Beautiful Beings is a 2022 Icelandic coming-of-age drama film written and directed by Guðmundur Arnar Guðmundsson. Set in the suburbs of Reykjavík during the 2000s, the film focuses on a group of teenage boys and the violence that surrounds them.

On 30 September 2022, the film was announced as Icelandic's submission for the Academy Award for Best International Feature Film at the 95th Academy Awards.

Reception 
In the United States' review aggregator, the Rotten Tomatoes, in the score where the site staff categorizes the opinions of independent media and mainstream media only positive or negative, the film has an approval rating of 85% calculated based on 20 critics reviews. By comparison, with the same opinions being calculated using a weighted arithmetic mean, the score achieved is 6.9/10.

In the Metacritic aggregator, which calculates the reviews using only an arithmetic weighted average from the evaluations of 9 critics who write mostly for the mainstream media, the film has a score of 58 out of 100, indicating "Mixed Or Average Reviews".

In his review on Los Angeles Times, Robert Abele said that "the pacing is sometimes shaggy, and the boys’ motivations are occasionally mysterious, but Guðmundsson’s young actors are magnetic in a physical, haunted way". At The Guardian, Peter Bradshaw rated it 3/5 of its grade saying that "Beautiful Beings is shot with real style, with very good performances, but the cliched and consequence-free violence is a flaw."

References

External links 
 

2022 films

2022 drama films
Icelandic drama films
2020s Icelandic-language films
2020s coming-of-age drama films